The 117th Ohio Infantry Regiment, sometimes 117th Ohio Volunteer Infantry (or 117th OVI) was an infantry regiment in the Union Army during the American Civil War.

Service
The 117th Ohio Infantry was organized at Portsmouth, Ohio, and eight companies mustered in September 15, 1862, for three years service under the command of Lieutenant Colonel Chauncey G. Hawley.

The regiment was attached to District of Eastern Kentucky, Department of the Ohio.

The 117th Ohio Infantry ceased to exist when it was changed to 1st Ohio Heavy Artillery on May 2, 1863.

Detailed service
Ordered to Kentucky October 2. Camp at Ashland, Kentucky, until January 1863. Moved to Paintsville, Kentucky, January 1863; then to Covington, Kentucky, via Peach Orchard, Louisa, and Catlettsburg, February 1863. Duty at Covington until May.

Commanders
 Lieutenant Colonel Chauncey G. Hawley

See also

 List of Ohio Civil War units
 Ohio in the Civil War

References
 Dyer, Frederick Henry. A Compendium of the War of the Rebellion (Des Moines, IA:  Dyer Pub. Co.), 1908.
 Miller, Hillborn C. History of the First Ohio Heavy Artillery (First Organized as the 117th Ohio Volunteer Infantry) (S.l.:  s.n.), 1966. 
 Ohio Roster Commission. Official Roster of the Soldiers of the State of Ohio in the War on the Rebellion, 1861–1865, Compiled Under the Direction of the Roster Commission (Akron, OH: Werner Co.), 1886–1895.
 Reid, Whitelaw. Ohio in the War: Her Statesmen, Her Generals, and Soldiers (Cincinnati, OH: Moore, Wilstach, & Baldwin), 1868. 
Attribution

External links
 Ohio in the Civil War: 117th Ohio Volunteer Infantry by Larry Stevens
 117th OVI Veteran memorial

Military units and formations established in 1862
Military units and formations disestablished in 1863
Units and formations of the Union Army from Ohio
1862 establishments in Ohio